Aethes turialba is a species of moth of the  family Tortricidae. It is found in Costa Rica.

References

Moths described in 1920
turialba
Moths of Central America